Smedvig is a surname. Notable people with the surname include:

Anna Margaret Smedvig (born 1983), Norwegian businesswoman
Peder Smedvig (1882–1959), Norwegian businessman
Peter Smedvig (born 1946), Norwegian businessman
Rolf Smedvig (1952–2015), American classical trumpeter
Torolf Smedvig (1917-1977), Norwegian businessman